The men's triathlon was one of the triathlon events at the 2012 Summer Olympics in London, United Kingdom. It took place on 7 August 2012, featuring 55 men from 32 countries. It was the fourth appearance of an Olympic men's triathlon event since the first at the 2000 Olympics in Sydney. The race was around Hyde Park, a 1.42 km2 park in central London. The race was held over the "international distance" (also called "Olympic distance") and consisted of  swimming,  road cycling, and  road running.

A group of six finished the  swim leg in a lead group. Great Britain's Jonathan Brownlee was given a 15-second penalty for an illegal transition between the swimming and cycling disciplines. A large lead group was together at the end of the cycling leg but Jonny Brownlee's brother Alistair Brownlee (Great Britain) broke away on the run to win the gold medal with Spain's Javier Gómez in second and Jonathan Brownlee in third. Alistair Brownlee earned Great Britain's nineteenth gold medal at the 2012 Games.

Almost immediately after the race, bronze-medallist Jonathan Brownlee collapsed due to heat stroke; it was confirmed he would suffer no permanent damage.

Qualification

Qualification for the race was restricted to three athletes per National Olympic Committee (NOC), an organisation representing a country at the Olympics, until eight NOCs had three qualified athletes. Once eight NOCs had qualified three athletes; a NOC was limited to two entries. A NOC with an athlete who won one of the five continental championships (Africa, Asia, Pan America, Europe and Oceania) were given one place in the event. Additionally, three places were available for the NOC of the medallists at the International Triathlon Union (ITU) World Qualification Event. Another 38 places were available to the NOCs with the highest ranked athletes on the ITU Olympic Qualification List on 31 May 2012. If an athlete had already qualified through another method the NOC did not receive another quota with it instead going to the next NOC on the ITU Olympic Qualification List. Five more entries into the event were given to one NOC per continental region. This was based on the ITU Olympic Qualification List with the highest ranked athlete from a non-qualified NOC in their continental region qualifying a place for their NOC in the event. One was given to the Great Britain NOC as the hosts but as they had already gained a place, the host place was given to the highest eligible athlete on the ITU Olympic Qualification List's NOC. The final two places for the event was given to two NOCs chosen by the Tripartite Commission.

For all qualification places the qualified NOC had the right to select any athlete who, by 31 May 2012, were in the top 140 of the ITU Olympic Qualification List, in the top 140 of the 2012 ITU World Triathlon Series or in the top 140 of the ITU Points List.

Preview
Alistair Brownlee and Jonathan Brownlee were considered strong favourites before the race. The 2000 men's Olympic triathlon champion, Canadian Simon Whitfield, said that, "If you run this Olympic race ten times, one of the Brownlee brothers will win nine out of ten times. But they won’t win it that 10th time, and you try to be that person to be there to capitalise on it that 10th time.” Among other contenders were Javier Gómez of Spain, who was the ITU Triathlon World Champion in both the 2008 World Championships and the 2010 World Championships; New Zealander Bevan Docherty; Whitfield of Canada and the 2008 Olympic champion Jan Frodeno from Germany.

Course

The event was contested in Hyde Park in Central London, a park opened in 1637. The  swim started on the north side of The Serpentine and the course was one lap. One of the female competitors, Laura Bennett, said that the swim was the hardest part of the course after competing in the London leg of the 2011 ITU World Championship Series on the Olympic course: “The swim was the most difficult, it was hard to get away from everyone.” After the swim there was then a  transition zone in front of the main grandstand. The competitors then started a  bike leg consisting of seven  laps. The cyclists first rode down Serpentine Road towards West Carriage Drive before changing direction and cycling to Hyde Park Corner. The course then quickly turned left towards Hyde Park to go past Buckingham Palace on Constitution Hill. Once passing Buckingham Palace, the cyclist turned and went back towards Hyde Park and eventually crossing through the transition area before starting the next lap. The final discipline was the run. It was four-laps of a  loop around The Serpentine on flat ground.

The course was designed to be as spectator-friendly as possible. The athletes passed through the main grandstand area 12 times. The men's triathlon was one of the few events with free viewing points.

Race

The race started at 11:30 a.m. on 7 August 2012. Richard Varga led early in the swim and held the lead to come out of the water first. His swim leg split time was 16minutes and 56seconds, fourseconds faster than Javier Gómez and those two; along with both of the Brownlees, Ivan Vasiliev and Alessandro Fabian; formed a lead group of six that had an 11second gap over the rest of the field. At the transition between the running and cycling legs, Jonathan Brownlee was given a 15second penalty for riding his bike before the transition zone. On the ride the race reformed with a 22-man strong group together for the majority of the discipline. Alistair Brownlee, aware of both his superiority in the run leg and the penalty facing his brother, put the hammer down from the very beginning of the run, aiming to crack the rest of the field and create a gap for himself and his brother. The senior Brownlee soon started to run away from the rest of the field with only his brother and Gómez attempting to follow him. Alistair Brownlee would go on to win the race in a time of onehour, 46minutes and 25seconds, beating Gómez by 11seconds. Despite having to serve his time penalty at the end of the second-last running lap, the brutal speed of the group of three worked as Jonathan Brownlee held on to the bronze medal position, 20seconds behind Gómez but 18seconds in front of fourth-placed David Hauss of France.

Bronze-medallist Jonathan Brownlee collapsed almost immediately after crossing the finish line. Paramedics gave him treatment and diagnosed heat stroke. He was taken to the medical tent where it was determined he would suffer no long-lasting effects.

Alistair Brownlee criticised the penalty that he thought cost his brother the silver medal: "I've never been a fan of these penalties, I think they're ruining the sport." Alistair also called the rules "disgusting" and accused triathlon organisers of "ruining" the sport.

Results

Key
# denotes the athlete's bib number for the event
Swimming denotes the time it took the athlete to complete the swimming leg
Cycling denotes the time it took the athlete to complete the cycling leg
Running denotes the time it took the athlete to complete the running leg
Difference denotes the time difference between the athlete and the event winner
* The total time includes both transitions

Notes

References

External links
 

Triathlon at the 2012 Summer Olympics
Olympics
Men's events at the 2012 Summer Olympics